is a TV station affiliated with Fuji News Network (FNN) and Fuji Network System (FNS) in Niigata, Niigata.  It is broadcast in Niigata Prefecture. It was established on March 2, 1968, and began broadcasting from December 16, 1968.

TV channel

Digital Television 
 Yahiko 19ch JONH-DTV 3 kW

Tandem office 
 Takada 25ch
 Mikawa 43ch
 Tsunan-Kamigō 18ch, 24ch
 Koide 28ch 
 Kanose 19ch 
 Itoigawa-Ōno 18ch
 Tsunan 43ch
 Ryōtsu 31ch 
 Aikawa 30ch 
 Yamato 34ch 
 Takachi 17ch 
 Arai 45ch
 Murakami 25ch 
 Sotokaifu 24ch 
 Yuzawa 19ch
 Tsunan-Tanaka 19ch
 Sumon 34ch
 Muramatsu 43ch
Other

Program

Syndicated shows from the TX Network:

External links
 The official website of Niigata Sogo Television 

Fuji News Network
Television stations in Japan
Television channels and stations established in 1968
Mass media in Niigata (city)
Companies based in Niigata Prefecture